Deivid de Souza, commonly known as Deivid (born 22 October 1979), is a Brazilian professional football coach and former player who most recently managed Criciúma.

Club career

Early career
He was transferred from Santos, where he was paired with Robinho, at the beginning of the 2005–2006 to Sporting CP for a sum of €3.7 million. This was the second time that he tried his hand in Europe after a short spell in France ended roughly a year prior.

Fenerbahçe
Deivid was transferred to Fenerbahçe SK in August 2006 for a sum of €4.5 million. He scored the second goal in the 88th minute against Trabzonspor on 13 May 2007 and helped Fenerbahçe win the Turkish Super League Championship after the game finishing 2–2 crowned them champions. However, he has not satisfied the supporters of the club yet and only performed well in a couple of matches in the last year. Football circles were sure that his contract would be terminated by the club due to his poor performance.

Deivid proved them wrong by becoming the star of the preseason training camp and by scoring an important goal against Beşiktaş J.K. in the Turkish Super Cup final and by scoring the decisive goal against Internazionale in the first match of the 2007–08 UEFA Champions League in the Şükrü Saracoğlu Stadium on 19 September 2007.

Deivid would score another important European goal for Fenerbahçe on the 2nd Champions League match day, to help them record a 2–2 draw away at CSKA Moscow. In the 3rd Champions League match day he was sent off against PSV Eindhoven.

In the 2007–08 UEFA Champions League round of 16 against Sevilla in Spain, Deivid also scored two goals which carried the match to extra time and then penalties. With his goals Fenerbahçe eliminated Sevilla and made it to the quarter final of the tournament for the first time in their history. In the first leg of the quarter final match against Chelsea F.C. Deivid scored an own goal in the thirteenth minute, when an attempted Florent Malouda cross struck his foot and passed his own keeper. He atoned for this mistake when he scored an astonishing 35-yard shot 9 minutes from the finish to give Fenerbahce a 2–1 lead after Colin Kazim-Richards had equalised.

During the preparation for the 2008–2009 season he broke his left leg fibula and, shortly thereafter, his mother died which depressed him. He made his comeback from injury on 25 October 2008, when he joined the Turkish Super League game against Bursaspor at the 77th minute to substitute Semih Şentürk. He scored a goal during stoppage time.

Flamengo
In early August 2010, Fenerbahçe announced that the club and Deivid had mutually agreed to terminate Deivid's contract. Deivid then joined Flamengo. On 22 February 2012, Deivid missed what appeared to be a simple tap-in goal against Vasco da Gama, in the Clássico dos Milhões, in the semifinals of the Taça Guanabara.

Coritiba
On 3 September 2012, Deivid, after breaking his contract with Flamengo, signed with Coritiba until April 2015.

Coaching career
After hanging up his boots, Deivid did several internships and coaching courses. In 2014, he was hired as an assistant at Flamengo, working alongside Vanderlei Luxemburgo. On 5 April 2015, he had its first game as a coach, replacing Luxemburgo which had been punished by FERJ with 2 games of suspension. Under his command Flamengo beat Fluminense by 3–0 in a Taça Guanabara game. He followed Luxemburgo as an assistant for Cruzeiro. After the exit of the manager, he remained in the permanent staff of the club. After the exit of the Mano Menezes, he signed as a manager.

Career statistics
(Correct )

according to combined sources on the Flamengo official website and Flaestatística.

Honours
Corinthians
Copa do Brasil: 2002

Cruzeiro
Brazilian Série A: 2003
Copa do Brasil: 2003

Santos
Brazilian Série A: 2004

Fenerbahçe
Süper Lig: 2006–07
Turkish Super Cup: 2007, 2009

Flamengo
Rio de Janeiro State League: 2011

Coritiba
Paraná State Championship: 2013

References

External links
 Guardian Stats Centre
 

Living people
1979 births
People from Nova Iguaçu
Brazilian footballers
Brazilian football managers
Brazilian expatriate footballers
Brazilian expatriate sportspeople in Turkey
Expatriate footballers in Turkey
Expatriate footballers in France
Expatriate footballers in Portugal
Campeonato Brasileiro Série A players
Campeonato Brasileiro Série A managers
Ligue 1 players
Primeira Liga players
Süper Lig players
Nova Iguaçu Futebol Clube players
Joinville Esporte Clube players
Santos FC players
Sport Club Corinthians Paulista players
Cruzeiro Esporte Clube players
FC Girondins de Bordeaux players
Sporting CP footballers
Fenerbahçe S.K. footballers
CR Flamengo footballers
Coritiba Foot Ball Club players
Cruzeiro Esporte Clube managers
Criciúma Esporte Clube managers
Association football forwards
Sportspeople from Rio de Janeiro (state)